Tommy Naurin (born 17 May 1984) is a Swedish former professional footballer who played as a goalkeeper. He is currently assistant and goalkeepers coach of GIF Sundsvall, alongside manager Henrik Åhnstrand.

On 23 September 2018, it was announced that Naurin was forced to retire from professional football due to a knee injury. In total, he made 94 appearances in Allsvenskan for GIF Sundsvall and Örgryte IS.

After his playing career, he remained in GIF Sundsvall's marketing organisation and as a player coordinator.

In the autumn of 2019, he stepped in as goalkeepers coach and in 2020 he also became assistant coach.

References

External links

1984 births
Living people
Association football goalkeepers
Örgryte IS players
Falkenbergs FF players
GIF Sundsvall players
Qviding FIF players
Allsvenskan players
Superettan players
Sweden youth international footballers
Swedish footballers
Footballers from Gothenburg